The Killers Are Our Guests  (originally titled Gli assassini sono nostri ospiti) is a 1974 Italian crime-thriller film directed by Vincenzo Rigo.

Plot 
Franco, Eliana and Mario rob a jewelry store in Milan and take flight. Franco, however, was injured in the shootout with the police, so the group decides to  temporarily take refuge in the secluded villa of Dr. Malerba. Meanwhile, they wait the arrival of Eddy, the head of the organization, the tension in the house steadily rises.

Cast 

 Anthony Steffen as  Guido Malerba
 Margaret Lee as  Eliana
 Luigi Pistilli as Police Commissioner Di Stefano
 Gianni Dei as  Franco
  Livia Cerini as Mara Malerba
 Giuseppe Castellano as  Mario
 Sandro Pizzocchero as  Eddy

References

External links

1974 films
Italian crime thriller films
1970s crime thriller films
1970s Italian films